Hacker The Dog (born 27 October), more commonly known as Hacker T. Dog, is a Border Terrier dog puppet who appears on the CBBC television channel in the United Kingdom. He is described as being born and living in Wigan, Greater Manchester. He is the half-brother of Dodge T. Dog and is the son of Mrs. T. Dog, with a father never mentioned or seen. He is voiced by puppeteer Phil Fletcher. Hacker T. Dog has been influential for young lives, and many teenagers can remember his appearances on CBBC.

Development
Hacker was introduced as a character in the CBBC television programme Scoop, performed by Andy Heath. Hacker used to be an unintelligible dog. The character became popular, and began to appear as a weekday presenter at the CBBC office in May 2009, with the puppetry and voice now being performed by Phil Fletcher. His "half-brother" Dodge T. Dog joined the following year. In July, he began presenting on weekdays with Scottish comedian Iain Stirling. He presented with Stirling until his departure in 2013, when they began presenting with Chris Johnson.

In 2011, Hacker was given a solo presenting role on a separate chat show titled Hacker Time.

The character took a hiatus from CBBC in April 2014. During his absence, numerous guest presenters filled in for him during his usual weekday afternoon slot. Hacker returned temporarily on 24 May 2014, before making a permanent return on 18 June 2014.

A 2016 clip in which Hacker deadpans to host Lauren Layfield "We're just normal men... We're just innocent men.", prompting Layfield to break character and laugh while Hacker continues to deadpan has resurfaced in 2022 and went viral. While some assumed the clip had context before the exchange, Fletcher later explained that there was none, and he just ad-libbed the line to make Layfield laugh.

Hacker is very fond of television presenter Sue Barker and mentions her often. In 2009 Hacker was the mascot for the Wimbledon Lawn Tennis Championship.

Hacker is known for saying ‘cockers’ - a Northern term for ‘mate’.

In other media
Hacker, Barry Davies and Amberley Lobo provided CBBC commentary on the Russia v Belgium match at the 2014 FIFA World Cup.

Hacker appeared on an episode of Celebrity Mastermind in December 2016, his specialist subject being the Pet Shop Boys. He came in second place, losing to television chef Paul Rankin.

A Hacker T. Dog plush puppet was released in 2015 and made by Kidz Kreations, and sold in Argos and The Entertainer.

Social media
Hacker gained an official Twitter account in 2014, which as of March 2021 has over 42,000 followers. An Instagram account was eventually created in April 2019, followed by an official YouTube channel. These social media channels are run by both Phil Fletcher and the BBC social media team.

Television
The character has appeared in the following roles:

See also
Scoop
Hacker Time
Andy Heath (puppeteer)
Phil Fletcher
Warrick Brownlow-Pike
Sue Barker
List of CBBC presenters

References

Fictional dogs
British comedy puppets